Kgosi Seepapitso IV (17 October 1933, Thaba Nchu – 24 March 2010, Gaborone) was a chief of the Ngwaketse tribe of Botswana.  He was the son of the late Chief Bathoen II. He led the House of Chiefs for many years and was one of the most respected chiefs in Botswana. Seepapitso also served as the ambassador to the United States and to China.

References

1933 births
2010 deaths
Botswana diplomats
Ambassadors of Botswana to the United States
Ambassadors of Botswana to China
Botswana chiefs